Jeong Seung-won (born 29 August 1970) is a South Korean boxer. He competed in the men's super heavyweight event at the 1992 Summer Olympics.

References

1970 births
Living people
South Korean male boxers
Olympic boxers of South Korea
Boxers at the 1992 Summer Olympics
Place of birth missing (living people)
Super-heavyweight boxers